Iceland Review is the oldest English-language magazine about Iceland, having originally been published in August 1963. It also runs a news website which covers current events in Iceland. Since 2009, the online version is offered in German as well. The Iceland Review magazine publishes reports on Icelandic society, politics, pop culture, music, art, literature, current events, as well as interviews with notable Icelanders, articles on traveling in Iceland, and photo essays on Iceland. The magazine is published on a bi-monthly basis.

References

External links
 

1963 establishments in Iceland
Cultural magazines
English-language magazines
Entertainment magazines
Magazines established in 1963
Magazines published in Iceland
Mass media in Reykjavík
Quarterly magazines